WWIC (1050 AM, "Real Country 1050") is a radio station licensed to serve Scottsboro, Alabama.  The station, established in 1950, is owned by Scottsboro Broadcasting Co.

Formatting 
WWIC airs a classic country music format featuring the "Real Country" satellite-delivered format from ABC Radio.

As of 2021, WWIC carries the following:
MRN Radio Network
Alabama Crimson Tide sports RollTide.com
Tennessee Titans football 
Paul Finebaum's sports talk show
Nashville Predators hockey
CBS Sports Radio
Slap Shot Radio
Mike Huckabee's political commentary
CBS News
Atlanta Braves Radio Network (baseball)
WWIC owner Greg Bell provides play-by-play coverage of Scottsboro High School Wildcats football and basketball.

The station streams via the internet and also has an app devoted to local weather coverage.

History 
The station was founded in 1950 as a 250-watt station broadcasting on 1050 kHz as WCRI, under the ownership of Pat M. Courington. The station was assigned the WWIC call letters by the Federal Communications Commission on February 4, 1982.
When the callsign was changed, it stood for the phrase "We Worship In Christ", to promote the gospel format that aired at the time.

References

External links
 WWIC official website

WIC
Classic country radio stations in the United States
Radio stations established in 1950
CBS Sports Radio stations
1950 establishments in Alabama